Stanley Herbert (27 June 1905 – 1 January 1967) was a British commercial artist active in the 1930s to 1960s.

Among his clients were The Radio Times, for which he painted covers, and London Transport and Imperial Airways, for both of whom he designed posters. His other clients included the RAF, BOAC, Danish Bacon and the National Savings Bank, and the children's comics 'Eagle', 'Girl' and 'Jack and Jill'. He painted the portrait of Maid Marian used as a logo for the convenience food store chain of that name, which was use until the 1980s.

He also worked in scraperboard, and illustrated a number of books. He taught poster design at the Reimann School, London.

Herbert died at Addenbrookes Hospital, Cambridge on 1 January 1967.

Bibliography 

Books illustrated by Herbert include:

References

External links 
 Posters by Herbert in the National Air and Space Museum, USA
 Posters by Herbert in the London Transport Museum
 Greetings telegram design (1951), for the General Post Office, in the V&A Museum.
 Books illustrated by Herbert

British poster artists
1905 births
1967 deaths
British children's book illustrators
British illustrators
Wildlife artists
British comics artists